Tragidion auripenne is a species of beetle in the family Cerambycidae. It was described by Casey in 1893.

References

Trachyderini
Beetles described in 1893